Donovan is an Irish surname and given name. The O'Donovan family takes its name from Donnubán mac Cathail.

People

Military and intelligence 

Edward Westby Donovan (1821–1897), commander of British Troops in China, also colonel of the East Yorkshire Regiment
Francis L. Donovan, USMC general
James B. Donovan (1916–1970), American lawyer and sailor
Matthew Donovan (born 1958), Under Secretary of Defense for Personnel and Readiness, retired US Air Force colonel
William J. Donovan (1883–1959), American lawyer, soldier, and espionage chief

Government 
Bob Donovan (born 1956), Wisconsin politician
Christopher G. Donovan (born 1953), Connecticut politician
Dan Donovan (politician), American politician
Daniel M. Donovan Jr. (born 1956), United States Representative from New York City
Francis Patrick Donovan (1922–2012), Australian ambassador to OECD and UN
James G. Donovan (1898–1987), Democratic politician, former New York State Senator and US Representative
James H. Donovan (1923–1990), Republican politician, former New York State Senator
Jeremiah Donovan (1857–1935), Connecticut politician
Jerome F. Donovan (1872–1949), US Representative from New York
Johannah Leddy Donovan (born 1944), American educator and politician
J. J. Donovan (1858–1937), Washington state pioneer and politician
John Thomas Donovan (1878–1922), Irish nationalist politician
Raymond J. Donovan (1930–2021), American businessman and Secretary of Labor (1981–1985)
Shaun Donovan (born 1966), American former US Secretary of Housing and Urban Development and director of the Office of Management and Budget
Terence Donovan, Baron Donovan (1898–1971), British Labour Party politician and judge

Business and finance 
Jim Donovan (born 1967), a managing director at Goldman Sachs
Paul Donovan (born 1972), UBS Global Chief Economist

Religion 
John Anthony Donovan (1911–1991), Bishop of Toledo
Paul Vincent Donovan (1924–2011), Bishop of Kalamazoo

Academia 
Claire Donovan (1948–2019), British historian
Herman Lee Donovan (1887–1964), President of the University of Kentucky
John J. Donovan (born 1943), American professor of management science and entrepreneur
Josephine Donovan (born 1941), American scholar
Mary Josephine Donovan O'Sullivan (1887–1966), scholar

Sport 
Art Donovan (1924–2013), American football player
Bill Donovan (1876–1923), American baseball player and manager
Bill Donovan (Boston Braves pitcher) (1916–1997), American baseball player
Billy Donovan (born 1965), American basketball coach
Brendan Donovan (born 1997), German–born American baseball player
Dick Donovan (1927–1997), Major League Baseball pitcher
Don Donovan (1929–2013), Irish footballer and manager
Kevin Donovan (born 1971), English football player
Landon Donovan (born 1982), American soccer player
Professor Mike Donovan (1847–1918), boxer
Patsy Donovan (1865–1953), Irish-American professional baseball player
Roy Donovan (1903–1972), Australian rules footballer
Shean Donovan (born 1975), Canadian ice hockey player

Fashion 
Carrie Donovan (1928–2001), American fashion magazine editor
Terence Donovan (photographer) (1936–1996), British photographer

Entertainment 
Casey Donovan (actor), (1943–1987), American gay porn star, born John Calvin Culver
Casey Donovan (singer), (born 1988), Australian singer
Chris Donovan (director), American television director and producer
Daisy Donovan (born 1973), English television presenter, actress, and writer
Dan Donovan (guitarist) (born 1960), British singer/songwriter
Dan Donovan (keyboardist) (born 1962), British rock musician
Elisa Donovan (born 1971), American actress, writer, and producer
Jacquelyn Piro Donovan, American musical theater actress and singer
Jason Donovan (born 1968), Australian pop rock singer and actor
Lisa Donovan (born 1980), American internet actress
Mark Donovan (actor) (born 1958), Welsh actor
Martin Donovan (born 1957), American actor
Michael Donovan (born 1953), Canadian voice actor and voice director 
Paul Donovan (born 1954), creator of LEXX
Tate Donovan (born 1963), American actor
Terence Donovan (actor) (born 1942), Australian actor

Other 
Allen F. Donovan (1914–1995), American aerospace engineer
Charles Donovan (1863–1951), Irish-born Anglo-Indian naturalist 
Daniel Donovan (died 1880), doctor of medicine and author
Edward Donovan (1768–1837), Anglo-Irish zoologist 
Gerard Donovan (born 1959),  Irish novelist and poet
Hedley Donovan (1914–1990), American magazine editor
Jean Donovan (1953–1980), American lay missionary
Natasha Donovan, Métis Canadian illustrator
Tara Donovan (born 1969), American artist

Fictional characters 
 Walter Donovan, main antagonist in Indiana Jones and the Last Crusade, portrayed by English actor Julian Glover

As a given name 
People with given name include:
Donovan Bailey (born 1967), Jamaican-Canadian sprinter, former 100 metre world record holder
Donovan Blake (born 1961), Jamaican-born American cricketer
Donovan Cook (born 1968), American film director, cartoon creator and producer
Donovan Danhausen (born 1990), American professional wrestler better known as Danhausen
Donovan Fenton, American politician
Donavon Frankenreiter (born 1972), American singer-songwriter
Donovan Gans (born 1971), American football player
Donovan Jeter (born 1998), American football player
Donovan Phillips Leitch (born 1946), Scottish folk musician (professionally known simply as Donovan)
Donovan Leitch (actor) (born 1967), British-American actor, son of Donovan Phillips Leitch
Donovan McNabb (born 1976), American football player
Donovan Mitchell (born 1996), American basketball player
Donovan Patton (born 1978), American host, actor and singer
Donovan Peoples-Jones (born 1999), American football player
Donovan Ricketts (born 1977), Jamaican soccer player
Donovan Slacks, leader of a militant British fishermen's uprising in the 1920s 
Donovan Simmonds (born 1988), English football (soccer) player
Donovan Solano (born 1987), Colombian baseball second baseman for the San Francisco Giants
Donovan Walton (born 1994), American baseball player
Donovan Wilson (American football) (born 1995), American football player

See also
Donovan (disambiguation)

English-language surnames
English-language masculine given names
Anglicised Irish-language surnames